The 2011–12 season will be Vasas SC's 84th competitive season, 8th consecutive season in the OTP Bank Liga and 100th year in existence as a football club.

First team squad

Transfers

Summer

In:

Out:

Winte

In:

Out:

List of Hungarian football transfer summer 2011
List of Hungarian football transfers winter 2011–12

Statistics

Appearances and goals
Last updated on 27 May 2012.

|-
|colspan="14"|Youth players

|-
|colspan="14"|Players no longer at the club

|}

Top scorers
Includes all competitive matches. The list is sorted by shirt number when total goals are equal.

Last updated on 27 May 2012

Disciplinary record
Includes all competitive matches. Players with 1 card or more included only.

Last updated on 27 May 2012

Overall
{|class="wikitable"
|-
|Games played || 38 (30 OTP Bank Liga, 2 Hungarian Cup and 6 Hungarian League Cup)
|-
|Games won || 6 (5 OTP Bank Liga, 1 Hungarian Cup and 0 Hungarian League Cup)
|-
|Games drawn || 12 (9 OTP Bank Liga, 0 Hungarian Cup and 3 Hungarian League Cup)
|-
|Games lost || 20 (16 OTP Bank Liga, 1 Hungarian Cup and 3 Hungarian League Cup)
|-
|Goals scored || 45
|-
|Goals conceded || 72
|-
|Goal difference || -27
|-
|Yellow cards || 82
|-
|Red cards || 5
|-
|rowspan="1"|Worst discipline ||  Haris Mehmedagić (9 , 0 )
|-
|rowspan="1"|Best result || 3–0 (H) v Újpest FC - OTP Bank Liga - 02-10-2011
|-
|rowspan="2"|Worst result || 0–4 (A) v Budapest Honvéd FC - OTP Bank Liga - 30-07-2011
|-
| 1–5 (A) v Pécsi Mecsek FC - OTP Bank Liga - 26-11-2011
|-
|rowspan="1"|Most appearances ||  Gábor Kovács (34 appearances)
|-
|rowspan="1"|Top scorer ||  Marko Šimić (7 goal)
|-
|Points || 30/114 (26.32%)
|-

Nemzeti Bajnokság I

Matches

Classification

Results summary

Results by round

Hungarian Cup

League Cup

Matches

Classification

References

External links
 Eufo
 Official Website
 UEFA
 fixtures and results

Vasas SC seasons
Hungarian football clubs 2011–12 season